Charles Lindsay Longest (born 1933) was suffragan bishop of the Episcopal Diocese of Maryland from 1989 to 1997. He was consecrated on October 14, 1989, and retired on the same date in 1997, the 8th anniversary of his consecration as a bishop. Longest's successor as suffragan was John Leslie Rabb.

References 
Episcopal Clerical Directory 2015

External links 
Episcopal Church bids suffragan farewell: Assistant bishop retires after 38 years

1933 births
Living people
Place of birth missing (living people)
Episcopal bishops of Maryland